Mieczysław Młynarski (born May 17, 1956 in Resko) is a retired Polish professional basketball player, and coach. At a height of 1.99 m (6'6 ") tall, and a weight of 91 kg (200 lbs.), he played at the small forward position, during his playing career.

Playing career

Club career
Młynarski still holds the Polish Basketball League record, for the "most points scored in one game" (90 points scored, achieved in 1982, while playing with Górnik Wałbrzych, in a game against Pogoń Szczecin). He was a member of the FIBA European Selection team, in 1981.

Polish national team
Młynarski was a regular member of the senior Polish national basketball team, for nine years (1975–1984). He played in all of Poland's games, during the Summer Olympic Games, in Moscow, 1980. He was the top scorer of both EuroBasket 1979 (26.6 points per game), and EuroBasket 1981 (23.1 points per game).

Coaching career
When Młynarski playing career, ended he decided to stay in basketball. After retirement from playing, he became a coach of the Polish club Górnik Wałbrzych' juniors team. In 2000, he won the Polish older juniors vice-championship (as the assistant coach) with Górnik.

In 2007, he became the assistant coach of Górnik Wałbrzych's senior club. After the club's head coach,
Andrzej Adamek, resignation (in March 2009), Młynarski became Górnik's new head coach. Unfortunately, Młynarski was not able to avoid his team's poor performance. In the 2008–09 season, Górnik finished in last place in the Polish PLK League. The main reason why the team was relegated, was its deep financial problems (Górnik finished the season without any foreign players, and some key Polish players, e.g. Marcin Stefański).

Awards and accomplishments

Club playing career
4× Polish League Top Scorer: (1980, 1981, 1983, 1984)
Polish League Player of the Year: (1981)
FIBA European Selection: (1981)
Polish League Champion: (1982)

Polish senior national team
2× FIBA EuroBasket Top Scorer: (1979, 1981)

References

External links
 FIBA Profile
 FIBA Europe Profile

1956 births
Living people
Basketball players at the 1980 Summer Olympics
Lech Poznań (basketball) players
People from Łobez County
Polish basketball coaches
Polish men's basketball players
Olympic basketball players of Poland
Small forwards
Sportspeople from West Pomeranian Voivodeship